Stephen Hagan may refer to:
 Stephen Hagan (author), Australian author and anti-racism campaigner
 Stephen Hagan (actor), actor from Northern Ireland